Tveiten is a surname. Notable people with the surname include:

Ivar Petterson Tveiten (1850–1934), Norwegian teacher and politician
John Tveiten (1933–1994), Norwegian wrestler
Margit Tveiten (born 1961), Norwegian diplomat
Ragnar Tveiten (born 1938), Norwegian biathlete
Rita Tveiten (born 1954), Norwegian politician

See also
Horten